Javier Marcelo Gandolfi (born 5 December 1980 in San Lorenzo, Santa Fe) is an Argentine football coach and former player who played as a defender. He is the current manager of Talleres.

Gandolfi also holds Mexican citizenship.

Playing career
Gandolfi started his career in 1999 at Argentine giants River Plate. He has also played for Talleres de Córdoba and his current club; Arsenal.

On 5 December 2007 Gandolfi captained Arsenal to the Copa Sudamericana 2007 title, due to the absence of regular captain Carlos Castiglione for the second leg of the final.

In 2009, Gandolfi was signed by Chiapas. He debuted on 17 January 2009 in a match against CF Atlas. In 2010, Gandolfi moved to Xolos de Tijuana.

Gandolfi returned to Talleres in 2016, and retired in 2021, aged 31.

Titles
Arsenal de Sarandí
 Copa Sudamericana: 2007

Tijuana
 Liga de Ascenso: Apertura 2010
 Ascenso MX: Apertura 2011
 Liga MX: Apertura 2012

References

 Javier Gandolfi, el primer refuerzo de Talleres en su regreso a Primera División‚ mundod.lavoz.com.ar, 25 June 2016

External links
 
 Argentine Primera statistics at Fútbol XXI  
 Statistics at Irish Times
 Javier Gandolfi at Football Lineups
 

Argentine footballers
Association football defenders
Club Atlético River Plate footballers
Talleres de Córdoba footballers
Arsenal de Sarandí footballers
Chiapas F.C. footballers
Club Tijuana footballers
Argentine Primera División players
Argentine expatriate footballers
Expatriate footballers in Mexico
Naturalized citizens of Mexico
People from San Lorenzo Department
Liga MX players
1980 births
Living people
Argentine emigrants to Mexico
Argentine football managers
Talleres de Córdoba managers
Sportspeople from Santa Fe Province